Angel on My Shoulder may refer to:

Music
 "Angel on My Shoulder" (Gareth Gates song)
 "Angel on My Shoulder" (Shelby Flint song), 1960, covered by Kathy Young, Jerry Wallace, and Jimmy Young
 "Angel on My Shoulder", a song by Kaskade with Tamra Keenan
 "Angel on My Shoulder", a song Merrilee Rush

Other media
 Angel on My Shoulder, autobiography of singer Natalie Cole
 Angel on My Shoulder (film), 1946 film starring Paul Muni
 Angel on My Shoulder (1980 film), 1980 TV movie directed by John Berry starring Peter Strauss

See also
 Shoulder angel